Mikael Aaltonen (born 12 January 1991) is a Finnish ice hockey player who currently plays professionally in Finland for TPS of the SM-liiga.

References

External links

1991 births
Living people
HC TPS players
Finnish ice hockey defencemen
21st-century Finnish people